Dengke mas na niura or na niura goldfish is a traditional Batak dish derived from Tapanuli, North Sumatra in Indonesia

It is said that the dish was once only served for the king but because it is so good, it is now eaten by many Batak people.

Na niura in the Batak language means that "the fish is not cooked". The complete raw fish is served with condiments so that would make the fish feel better without cooking, which means that the spices that are cooked goldfish.

See also

 Batak cuisine

References 
 Ikan mas na niura 
 Na Niura 
  

Batak cuisine